Saxton is an unincorporated community in Buchanan County, in the U.S. state of Missouri.

History
A post office called Saxton was established in 1872, and remained in operation until 1938. The community was named after Albe M. Saxton, the original owner of the town site.

References

Unincorporated communities in Buchanan County, Missouri
Unincorporated communities in Missouri